Douglas Harris (born 22 March 1966) is a Canadian former field hockey player who competed in the 1988 Summer Olympics. Harris was born in Toronto, Ontario, Canada.

References

External links
 

1966 births
Living people
Canadian male field hockey players
Olympic field hockey players of Canada
Field hockey players at the 1988 Summer Olympics
Pan American Games gold medalists for Canada
Pan American Games silver medalists for Canada
Field hockey players at the 1987 Pan American Games
Field hockey players at the 1991 Pan American Games
Field hockey players from Toronto
Pan American Games medalists in field hockey
Medalists at the 1987 Pan American Games
Medalists at the 1991 Pan American Games